Matthew R. Linford (born April 9, 1966) is an associate professor at Brigham Young University, Department of Chemistry and Biochemistry (Provo, Utah) since September 2006. His lab is devoted towards synthesizing hydrophobic surfaces, diamond stationary phases for liquid chromatography and microfabricated TLC plates.

Lindford works in surface modification and characterization, particularly in studying organic thin films (monolayer and polymer), modifying silicon, diamond, silicon oxide, gold, and polymers, surface patterning, surface organic chemistry, thin-film deposition with silanes, alkenes, thiols, and by sputtering. In his group they also undertake liquid chromatography (HPLC and TLC) and solid phase extraction (SPE), develop hydrophobic coatings for various materials, study materials for optical data storage, and perform surface analysis by XPS, ToF-SIMS, wetting, optical ellipsometry, and FTIR. His lab also performs chemometrics of mass spec data (PCA, MCR, cluster analysis, and PLS).

Academic history
Lindford did his BS in chemistry from Brigham Young University in September 1990, followed by MS in material sciences and PhD in Chemistry from Stanford University in June 1996. He served as a postdoctoral fellow at the Max Planck Institute for Colloid and Surface Sciences from July 1996 to June 1997.

Linford has worked on topics including supercritical fluid chromatography and the formation of first alkyl monolayers on silicon using diacylperoxides. He has studied the use of synchrotron radiation to characterize monolayers on silicon, worked on gas-phase free-radical modification of alkyl monolayers, devised a new method for coating particles, and studied the strong effect of ionic strength on surface dye extraction during dye-polymer multilayer formation. He has worked on growing semiconducting particles in polyelectrolyte multilayers, designed a cell to study the flow-induced orientation of polyelectrolytes on surfaces, described a mixing process using matrix algebra, synthesized and characterized films of novel polyelectrolytes.

Service in industrial sector
Lindford served for a few years in the industrial sector. While working as a senior scientist in Rohm and Haas Company, he developed an IR tool to do rapid screening of catalysts, and he designed and built a laser scanner for detecting defects on plastic sheet which was to be used as a substrate for flat panel liquid crystal displays. He has worked as a senior scientist/consultant for Praelux, Inc. and developed methods to immobilize single nucleotides and DNA oligomers onto surfaces, developed procedures to attach a nickel (NTA) chelator to glass cover slips to bind proteins with 6-his tags, developed novel methods to immobilize amines onto surfaces, performed surface patterning using microcontact printing, worked on bioconjugation of a protein to glass microspheres.

Lindford has served as a director of research for NanoTex, LLC. and developed the product “Nano-Dry” to make nylon and polyester hydrophilic. This product increases the comfort of fabrics and clothing, and is currently being marketed throughout the United States. (Tiger Woods is shown in the October, 2003 issue of Golf Digest wearing a pair of pants that have this finish on them – Nano-Dry had become part of the Nike golf collection. He has been an inventor on 10 patents from work with Nano-Tex. He designed and synthesized numerous polymers (mostly free radical polymerizations of acrylates and methacrylates) and formulated with polymers, surfactants, wetting agents and defoaming agents.

Companies

Lindford has been a founder of several companies.
 Laser Array Technologies, which develops novel laser patterning of surfaces to make bioarrays.
 Millenniata Inc. As of November 2009, Millenniata had approximately 35 employees, a brick-and-mortar site, and had raised approximately $12 million. He served on the board of Millenniata from June 2007 to April 2010. It also had a manufacturing partner in Salt Lake City with more than $2 million of equipment dedicated for Millenniata production, in addition to a partner in Prague with more than $1MM of equipment dedicated for Millenniata production. Millenniata developed M-DISC, a write once optical disc recording technology.
 Xeromax, Inc. In 2009 Xeromax received the "Outstanding Product: award at the Global Moot Corp competition at the University of Texas at Austin. In 2009 it also received First Place BYU Business Plan Competition and Second Place at the Wake Forest Elevator Pitch Competition (national business plan competition).

Service in academia
Lindford served as an assistant professor and then as associate professor at Brigham Young University. During this tenure he has published 23 peer-reviewed papers, 2 conference proceedings, 1 book chapter, 7 peer-reviewed contributions to spectral data bases, and 11 patents. His work was highlighted on the cover of Synthetic Metals, in the Journal of the American Chemical Society, in Accounts of Chemical Research, in Chemical and Engineering News, in LCGC and in Langmuir. His work on polymer growth on silicon appeared on the cover of Macromolecular Rapid Communications in 2008.

Lindford received the BYU Technology Transfer Award on August 25, 2009 at the annual BYU university conference. He was invited and was the first speaker at the Nagasaki Syposium on Nano-Dynamics 2009, Nagasaki University in Japan. He was named to the editorial board of the journal Nanoscience and Nanotechnology Letters (NNL) in 2008. He was a Co-PI on a $1,000,000 grant from NSF in 2007.

Honors and awards
Linford was named a Fellow of the American Vacuum Society in 2014.
Linford is also an accomplished and high ranking tennis player for the state of Utah, and frequently takes time out of his research to travel and participate in national tennis tournaments. His 2018 Estimated Dynamic is 3.5559, his current NTRP 3.5 S, and estimated rating as of 2018 is 4.0.

Footnotes

External links
 Homepage at BYU

1966 births
Living people
Brigham Young University alumni
Stanford University alumni
Brigham Young University faculty
21st-century American chemists